David F. Levine (born July 13, 1965) is an American author, a professor of physical therapy, and a biomedical scientist. He holds the Walter M. Cline Chair of Excellence in Physical Therapy at the University of Tennessee at Chattanooga. His research and publication contributions focus on veterinary rehabilitation and physical therapy, including canine physical therapy, animal assisted therapy, gait analysis and motion analysis, the use of modalities such as extracorporeal shockwave therapy, electrical stimulation, and therapeutic ultrasound, as well as clinical infectious disease research and Ehlers-Danlos Syndrome research.

Education
B.S. Physical Therapy, The University of New England
M.S. Orthopedic Physical Therapy, Boston University
Ph.D. Exercise Science, The University of Tennessee
DPT Doctor of Physical Therapy, The University of Tennessee at Chattanooga
MPH Master of Public Health, The University of Tennessee at Chattanooga

Academic and research areas of interest

Ehlers-Danlos Syndrome Patient Management 
Levine works with a team of faculty, students, and local partners to investigate different treatments for individuals with Ehlers-Danlos Syndrome. Most recently Levine and colleagues conducted research on occupational interventions for clients with EDS in the presence of POTS.

Infectious disease prevention 
As a member of University of Tennessee at Chattanooga's Research Interest Group on Clinical Infectious Disease Control, Levine works with a team of faculty, students, and local partners to investigate the efficacy of disease control in various local clinical settings and potentially decrease the spread of nosocomial infections. Most recently, Levine has contributed, along with members of his team, to research on contamination in pediatric intensive care units. Levine spoke on these subjects at the Association for Professionals in Infection Control and Epidemiology (APIC) 2019 Annual Conference in June 2019 and (APIC) 2022 Annual Conference in June 2022.

Canine rehabilitation 
Levine plays a part in the development of canine rehabilitation and physical therapy, and he is a certified canine rehabilitation practitioner in Tennessee. He has held adjunct positions at the Colleges of Veterinary Medicine at the University of Tennessee and NC State since 2001 and 2003, respectively. He currently co-chairs the University of Tennessee's Certificate Program in Canine Rehabilitation, one of only two such programs available in the United States. It offers certification for physical therapists, veterinarians, veterinary technicians, and physical therapy assistants. There is no accreditation available for this growing field, but both programs are "included in the Registry of Approved Continuing Education (RACE), which is the industry standard for veterinary continuing education."

Levine has been featured in various television stories, including special talks on the DogTV television channel regarding how animals can benefit human health, and also a news story on WDEF-TV channel 12 in Chattanooga about animal assisted therapy.  An article done by UTC's magazine features a story on how Levine became involved in animal physical therapy and how far it has come today.

University of Tennessee at Chattanooga 
In 1990, Levine accepted a position at the University of Tennessee at Chattanooga (UTC) as a professor in the physical therapy department, a position he still holds. He is actively involved in the enhancement and betterment of the university.

TEDx 
In recent years, Levine has become involved with the TEDx programs. His involvement includes active engagement on the TED website and in conversations on various TED talks.

Levine is the co-chair of TEDxChattanooga and played a vital part in the organization and execution of UTC's first TEDx event. The conference was titled "Now What?" and took place on October 25, 2014, on UTC's campus. A selection committee chose 12 speakers from a pool of 50 applicants to present on various topics. The audience was limited to 100, and the talks were streamed online and in auditoriums on UTC's campus.

With Levine's continued leadership, the TEDxChattanooga organization held their latest event, which took place in February 2016. Both the 2014 and 2016 events sold out.

In September 2017, he co-organized a third TEDx event in Chattanooga at Baylor School with TEDxBaylorSchool.

American Physical Therapy Association 
Levine is an active member in the American Physical Therapy Association (APTA). He has written home study courses for the APTA Orthopedic Section—including Biomechanics of Gait: Hip and Biomechanics of Gait: Knee—and was the subject matter expert for Basic Science for Animal Physical Therapists.

He is currently the vice chair of the Evidence Based Practice Special Interest Group (EBP SIG), which is housed under the APTA Section on Research and has created curriculum guidelines for physical therapy schools around the nation.

In 2018, he was honored as a Catherine Worthingham Fellow of the American Physical Therapy Association (FAPTA). This is the association's highest membership category, awarded to members who have "demonstrated unwavering efforts to advance the physical therapy profession for more than 15 years, prior to the time of nomination."

Other research and scholarly works 
Levine is on the editorial board for PeerJ, an award-winning biological and medical science journal, as well as Frontiers in Veterinary Science. He is also an associate member of the allied health research unit at the University of Central Lancashire.

He was an international key note speaker at the 2015 Connect Physiotherapy Conference that was hosted by the Australian Physiotherapy Association in Australia.

Publications

Books 
 Canine Rehabilitation and Physical Therapy, 1e
 Canine Rehabilitation and Physical Therapy, 2e
 Essential Facts of Physiotherapy in Dogs & Cats - Rehabilitation and Pain Management
 Veterinary Rehabilitation and Therapy, An Issue of Veterinary Clinics: Small Animal Practice (Nov. 2005)
 Whittle's Gait Analysis, 5e
 Rehabilitation and Physical Therapy, An Issue of Veterinary Clinics of North America: Small Animal Practice, 1e (The Clinics: Veterinary Medicine) (Jan. 2015)
 Gait Analysis: An Introduction
Better You Better Dog Better Life
Essential Facts of Physical Medicine, Rehabilitation and Sports Medicine in Companion Animals
Forensic Gait Analysis: Principles and Practice

Online publications 
Infection Prevention Is Key in a Neonatal Intensive Care Unit
Inpatient and Outpatient Clinics Must Monitor Fomites as Part of IPC Protocols
 Hiding in Plain Sight: How You Can Fight Bacterial Contamination in Your Clinic
Coronavirus: A Wake-up Call for Best Practices in Preventing Pathogen Transmission

Peer-reviewed journal articles and other research contributions 
Dr. Levine has been author or co-author on over 70 research articles in a variety of peer reviewed journals, including The American Journal of Veterinary Research, Veterinary Clinics of North America: Small Animal Practice, Gait and Posture, Medical Engineering and Physics, The Journal of Athletic Training, and The Journal of Orthopaedic and Sports Physical Therapy with over 50 articles indexed in PubMed. Dr. Levine is an associate editor of the veterinary surgery and anesthesiology section of the Frontiers in Veterinary Science journal. Dr. Levine is also a founding member of the Clinical Infectious Disease Control Research Unit at UT-Chattanooga and is a part of current and ongoing infectious disease research in the clinical setting.

References

External links 
 https://apic.org/

University of Tennessee faculty
University of New England (United States) alumni
Boston University College of Health and Rehabilitation Sciences (Sargent College) alumni
University of Tennessee alumni
American exercise and fitness writers
Living people
Place of birth missing (living people)
University of Tennessee at Chattanooga faculty
1965 births